Lipov Gaj ( also known as Zepter City) is a suburban settlement of the city of Novi Sad, Serbia.

Location
Lipov Gaj is located between Novi Sad and Veternik. Although officially regarded as part of Veternik, Lipov Gaj has certain characteristics of a distinct settlement.

Features
Lipov Gaj is surrounded by a security fence and there is a security guard at the entrance into the settlement. It's also regarded as an elite and upper-class part of the Novi Sad, because apart from luxurious apartments, there are also many mansions and aristocratic homes.

Notable residents
Nataša Bekvalac, pop singer
Dara Bubamara, pop-folk singer
Nenad Čanak, politician
Maja Gojković, politician
Danilo Ikodinović, water polo player

See also
 Neighborhoods of Novi Sad

External links
 Lipov Gaj

Suburbs of Novi Sad